Lanthanum hexaboride (LaB6, also called lanthanum boride and LaB) is an inorganic chemical, a boride of lanthanum. It is a refractory ceramic material that has a melting point of 2210 °C, and is insoluble in water and hydrochloric acid. It is extremely hard, with a Mohs hardness of 9.5. It has a low work function and one of the highest electron emissivities known, and is stable in vacuum. Stoichiometric samples are colored intense purple-violet, while boron-rich ones (above LaB6.07) are blue. Ion bombardment changes its color from purple to emerald green. LaB6 is a superconductor with a relatively low transition temperature of 0.45 K.

Uses 
The principal use of lanthanum hexaboride is in hot cathodes, either as a single crystal or as a coating deposited by physical vapor deposition. Hexaborides, such as lanthanum hexaboride (LaB6) and cerium hexaboride (CeB6), have low work functions, around 2.5 eV. They are also somewhat resistant to cathode poisoning. Cerium hexaboride cathodes have a lower evaporation rate at 1700 K than lanthanum hexaboride, but they become equal at temperatures above 1850 K. Cerium hexaboride cathodes have one and half the lifetime of lanthanum hexaboride, due to the former's higher resistance to carbon contamination. Hexaboride cathodes are about ten times "brighter" than tungsten cathodes, and have 10–15 times longer lifetime. Devices and techniques in which hexaboride cathodes are used include electron microscopes, microwave tubes, electron lithography, electron beam welding, X-ray tubes, free electron lasers and several types of electric propulsion technologies. Lanthanum hexaboride slowly evaporates from the heated cathodes and forms deposits on the Wehnelt cylinders and apertures. 

LaB6 is also used as a size/strain standard in X-ray powder diffraction to calibrate instrumental broadening of diffraction peaks.

References 

Lanthanum compounds
Borides
Refractory materials
Ceramic materials